In Mandaeism, Shdum (Šdum) or Ashdum (Ašdum) is a demon in the World of Darkness (alma ḏ-hšuka) or underworld. Hibil Ziwa encounters Shdum during his descent to the World of Darkness in Chapter 1 of Book 5 in the Right Ginza, where he is described as the "King of Darkness" and also as the "Grandson of Darkness" (br brḥ ḏ-hšuka).

He is also referred to as Šdum-Daiwa in The Thousand and Twelve Questions.

See also
Shedim
Ur (Mandaeism)

References

Demons in Mandaeism